Wabishaw Spencer Wiley (February 1, 1887 – November 3, 1944), nicknamed "Doc", was a catcher in Negro league baseball. He played from 1910 to 1924.

Baseball career
Wiley was born on February 1, 1877, in Vernon, Louisiana. He began his career in 1910 as a catcher for the West Baden Sprudels. He then played for the Brooklyn Royal Giants in 1910 and 1911 before moving on to the New York Lincoln Giants. In 1913, he had a batting average of .398. The following season, he batted .418. He also batted .441 in 1918. Wiley, who caught Baseball Hall of Fame pitcher Cyclone Joe Williams, was considered one of the best catchers of his era. His career ended in 1924.

Personal life
Wiley graduated from the Howard University School of Dentistry. He practiced dentistry during his baseball career and had offices in New Jersey.

During World War I, Wiley volunteered for military service. He was discharged in 1919. He died in 1944 in Jersey City, New Jersey.

Wiley received votes listing him on the 1952 Pittsburgh Courier player-voted poll of the Negro leagues' best players ever.

References

External links
 and Seamheads
Wabishaw Wiley at Arkansas Baseball Encyclopedia

1877 births
1944 deaths
Bacharach Giants players
Birmingham Giants players
Brooklyn Royal Giants players
Lincoln Giants players
Philadelphia Giants players
West Baden Sprudels players
American dentists
Sportspeople from Muskogee, Oklahoma
20th-century African-American people